Amal College of Advanced Studies is a post graduate government aided college affiliated to the University of Calicut.

About the college
The college was established in 2005 by the Nilambur Muslim Orphanage Committee. The college is recognised by the UGC under 2(f) & 12(b) and declared as Minority educational institution under sec 2(g) of the NCMEI Act 2004. It offers seven undergraduate programmes and one postgraduate programme in various disciplines. The college is in Shantigramam, a campus in Eranhimangad, on the banks of river Chaliyar, 4 km from Nilambur. The college and its hostels are open to all students regardless of caste, creed, colour, gender and social status. Dr.PM Abdul Sakir is the Principal in Charge of the college. Amal College has reserved 20% seats in all the courses for orphans and destitutes.

See also

References

External links
 College web site
 College blog
 ignou
 ASAP ranking in 2013
 ASAP ranking in 2015

2005 establishments in Kerala
Colleges affiliated with the University of Calicut
Colleges in Kerala
Educational institutions established in 2005
Universities and colleges in Malappuram district